The School of Nursing is part of the University of Washington (UW). It offers five degree programs accredited by the Commission on Collegiate Nursing Education: one bachelors, two masters and two doctoral. As of February 2014, there are "128 tenured faculty, research faculty and instructors; 359 affiliate and  clinical faculty; and 10 adjunct faculty"; and "over 650 students, including 400 graduate students".

History
The first course in public health nursing at the University of Washington was offered in the summer of 1918 by UW President Henry Suzzallo. Local nurse Elizabeth Sterling Soule established the Department of Nursing four years later. Students could earn a bachelor of science in nursing beginning in 1923. It became an independent school in 1945, the "second university-affiliated nursing school in the U.S." Soule was its first dean, retiring in 1950.

The school has been top-ranked nationally "in all surveys of schools of nursing conducted since 1984", an unprecedented 27 years without a break. In 2011, U.S. News & World Report rated it in a three-way tie for the top spot with Johns Hopkins University and the University of Pennsylvania. US News & World Report 2020 Best Nursing Schools: Doctor of Nursing Practice ranked UW fourth in the country.

In 2011, the Seattle Times reported low morale and "internal strife" ... "with separate departments and specialty areas pitted against one another and the school as a whole. The situation was also exacerbated by budget cuts. Dean Marla Salmon tendered her resignation in May 2011 after three years in the post. Azita Emami was named Dean of UW School of Nursing starting July 1, 2013. Dr. Emami had been the dean at Seattle University from 2008–2013.

References

Nursing
Nursing schools in Washington (state)
1945 establishments in Washington (state)